Han Myeong-seok (born 15 July 1944) is a South Korean fencer. He competed in the individual and team foil and épée events at the 1964 Summer Olympics.

References

External links
 

1944 births
Living people
South Korean male épée fencers
Olympic fencers of South Korea
Fencers at the 1964 Summer Olympics
South Korean male foil fencers